Pararistolochia is a formerly accepted genus in the plant family Aristolochiaceae. , it is considered a synonym of the genus Aristolochia.

Selected species
Species that have been placed in Pararistolochia include:
 Pararistolochia australopithecurus M.J.Parsons → Aristolochia australopithecurus – Australasian
 Pararistolochia ceropegioides (S.Moore) Hutch. & Dalz. → Aristolochia ceropegioides – African
 Pararistolochia enricoi Luino, L.Gaut & Callm. – Malagasy
 Pararistolochia goldieana (Hook.f.) Hutch. & Dalz. → Aristolochia goldieana – African
 Pararistolochia macrocarpa (Duch.) Poncy → Aristolochia macrocarpa – African
 Pararistolochia praevenosa (F.Muell.) M.J. Parsons → Aristolochia praevenosa – Australasian
 Pararistolochia preussii (Engl.) Hutch. & Dalziel → Aristolochia preussii – African
 Pararistolochia schlechteri (Laut.) M.J.Parsons → Aristolochia schlechteri – Australasian

References

 Leal, M.E., et al. 2011. Aristolochiaceae. In : Sosef, M.S.M., et al. (ed.), Fl. Gabon 42 : 5–10. Margraf Publishers, Weikersheim.
 Luino, I., et al. 2016. A new Pararistolochia Hutch. & Dalziel, (Aristolochiaceae) from the Beanka Tsingy (western Madagascar). Candollea,  71(1) : 135- 141.
 Parsons, M.J. 1996a. New species of Aristolochia and Pararistolochia (Aristolochiaceae) from Australia and New Guinea. Botanical Journal of the Linnean Society 120(3): 199–238.
 Parsons, M.J. 1996b. The immature stages of Pharmacophagus antenor (Drury) (Papilionidae : Troidini) from Madagascar. J. Lepid. Soc. 50 : 337–344.
 Poncy, O. 1978. Le genre Pararistolochia, Aristolochiaceae d’Afrique tropicale. Adansonia,  17 : 465- 494.

External links

 
Historically recognized angiosperm genera
Piperales genera
Taxonomy articles created by Polbot